Strung Out in Heaven is the seventh full-length album by American psychedelic rock band The Brian Jonestown Massacre. It was released in June 1998 and was the band's first and only recording with the large independent label, TVT Records.

Background 

After releasing a number of well-received recordings on the smaller psychedelia-focused Bomp! Records label, The Brian Jonestown Massacre were signed to a multi-record deal with TVT.

Recording and content 

Matt Hollywood contributed more to this record due to Anton Newcombe being incapable of writing as many songs as he was addicted to heroin at the time.

The album is named after a lyric from the David Bowie song "Ashes to Ashes".

"Wisdom" is a re-recording of the same song that originally appeared on the band's second album, Methodrone. "Dawn" is also a re-recording, with the original version appearing on Take It from the Man!. "Spun" is also a re-recording of the same song that appears on the band's album Thank God for Mental Illness.

Musical style 

AllMusic's Jason Ankeny writes, "Settling into a blissfully psychedelic drift, the album opts not for the Stones-inspired raunch of before but for Byrds-like guitars, muffled drums and pulsating Hammond organ lines, all topped off by Anton Newcombe's half-stoned, half-shamanic vocals".

Release 

The recording didn't sell as many records as TVT had hoped, and they later mutually dissolved their remaining contractual obligations.

"Love" was released as a CD single, with a demo of "Wasting Away" as a B-side on TVT Records in 1998. "Love" and "Nothing to Lose" was also released as a double A-side single independently in 1997. The release featured "Let's Pretend It's Summer", "I've Been Waiting", "The Devil May Care (Mom & Dad Don't)" and an alternate version of "I've Been Waiting" as B-sides.

Critical reception 

AllMusic praised the album, calling it "their least immediate, most restrained record to date [...] Strung Out in Heaven proves as engaging as their past efforts, with a focus and cohesiveness often lacking from their more visceral work", also calling it "the BJM's most mature outing yet". Head Heritage described it as "BJM's most easily accessible and truly genius album thus far."

Legacy 

The song Going to Hell is featured in American Pie as well as the "Faith, Hope & Trick" episode of Buffy the Vampire Slayer .

Track listing

Personnel

Anton Newcombe – vocals, guitar, bass, drums
Matt Hollywood – bass, guitar, vocals
Jeffrey Davies – guitar, organ
Dean Taylor – guitar
Joel Gion – percussion
Miranda Lee Richards – vocals, flute
Adam Hamilton – drums
Norm Block – drums
Johnny Haro – drums

References

1998 albums
The Brian Jonestown Massacre albums
TVT Records albums